The Joint is Jumping is a musical comedy film from 1949. A "race film" with an African American cast of performers, it was one of several such films produced by the All-American News film company and directed by Josh Binney. It was written by Hal Seeger. The 4-reel film was previewed in the Chicago Defender October 16, 1948.

The Phil Moore Four appeared in the film as well as a band called The All American Girl Band.

Cast
Rozelle Gayle
Bob Howard
Una Mae Carlisle
Hadda Brooks
Slick & Jack
John Mason
Charles Ray, who was white 
J. Patrick Patterson
Mattie Weaver
Gertrude Saunders
John Oscar
Frog Edwards
Eddie South
Phil Moore Four
The Jubalaires
The All American Girl Band
Doris Ratliff
George Lawson and his band

References

External links

1949 films
American musical films
Race films
1949 musical films
1940s American films